The Second Amendments was a bipartisan conservative rock/country/country rock band, all of the members of which were also members of the United States House of Representatives. It featured Representatives Collin Peterson (DFL-Minnesota) on guitar and lead vocals, Thaddeus McCotter (R-Michigan) on lead guitar, Dave Weldon (R-Florida) on bass, Jon Porter (R-Nevada) on keyboards, and Kenny Hulshof (R-Missouri) on drums.  The band broke up after the 2008 elections when two of its members, Hulshof and Weldon, retired, and Porter lost his reelection bid.  

The name is a reference to the United States Constitution as well as a previous band of Peterson's named the Amendments. The previous band broke up after their gigs became partisan with some members wanting to play at the Republican National Convention.

See also
 The Singing Senators, a barbershop quartet

References

External links
Rep. McCotter and the Second Amendments Play Farm Aid on YouTube.

American country rock groups
Members of the United States House of Representatives
Music and politics